In the Book of Mormon, Shiz is a military leader who was beheaded by Coriantumr. Since the nineteenth century, the account of Shiz's death in the Book of Ether has been claimed by critics to be an error in the Book of Mormon. Examples of anti-Mormon use of Shiz's death include: John R. Farkas and David A. Reed, Mormonism: Changes, Contradictions, and Errors (Grand Rapids, MI: Baker Books, 1995), 152; Ed Decker, Decker's Complete Handbook on Mormonism (Eugene: Harvest House, 1995), 114; Hank Hanegraaff, The Mormon Mirage: Seeing Through the Illusion of Mainstream Mormonism (Charlotte, NC: Christian Research Institute, 2008); Carma Naylor, A Mormon's Unexpected Journey: Finding the Grace I Never Knew (Enumclaw, WA: WinePress Publishing, 2006), 235; Latayne Colvett Scott, The Mormon Mirage : a former Mormon tells why she left the church (Grand Rapids, MI: Zondervan, 1979), 90; Reverend Benjamin Willmore, "Mormonism Absurd," West Bromwich, [1858?]</ref> However, Mormon apologists argue that the statement may be physiologically accurate.

Biography
An army led by Shiz (the brother of Lib) pursued an army led by Coriantumr, in the process destroying many cities and killing all their inhabitants. The struggle between the two armies became so protracted "that the whole face of the land was covered with the bodies of the dead."  Nevertheless, Shiz continued to fight, having sworn to avenge the death of his brother. Shiz pursued Coriantumr to the seashore where their troops fought a three-day battle. Coriantumr's troops twice defeated the troops of Shiz, but in the third encounter, Shiz wounded Coriantumr severely, giving him many deep wounds. Coriantumr was "carried away as though he were dead," but Shiz had lost so many people that he ordered his army not to pursue the rival army.

After two million of Coriantumr's people had been killed, Coriantumr offered his throne to Shiz in exchange for peace. Shiz responded that he would only stop the bloodshed if Coriantumr allowed Shiz to kill him. The two sides attacked each other once again, and the final battle was fought at the hill Ramah (Cumorah), where every Jaredite joined in the battle except for the prophet Ether. The people fought each other many days with neither side prevailing. In the end all the Jaredites were killed except for Coriantumr and Shiz. Shiz fainted from the loss of blood, and Coriantumr cut off his head.

The Book of Mormon concludes the story of Shiz's death at the hands of Coriantumr with the words: "And it came to pass that after he [Coriantumr] had smitten off the head of Shiz, that Shiz raised up on his hands and fell; and after that he had struggled for breath, he died."

Apologetic response
Concerning the description of Shiz's death, the Mormon Foundation for Apologetic Information & Research argues that, based on modern neuroanatomy, the account of Shiz's death is actually "a realistic touch" and represents "a phenomenon that went unrecognized in the medical literature of the modern era until 1898. It is one more mark of the Book of Mormon's status as genuine history."

References

External links
Text of the Book Ether

Book of Mormon people
Criticism of Mormonism